Kavand may refer to:
 Kavand, Chaharmahal and Bakhtiari (كاوند - Kāvand)
 Kavand, East Azerbaijan  (كواند - Kavānd)
 Kavand, Kohgiluyeh and Boyer-Ahmad (كاوند - Kāvand)
 Kavand, Qazvin (كوند - Kavand)
 Kavand, Zanjan (كاوند - Kāvand)